Periodic elections for the Tasmanian Legislative Council were held on 1 May 2005. The three seats up for election were Murchison, held by independent MLC Tony Fletcher; Paterson, held by independent MLC Don Wing; and Rumney, held by Labor MLC Lin Thorp. Paterson was last contested in 2000, while Murchison and Rumney were last contested in 1999.

Murchison
Murchison had been held since its creation in 1999 by Tony Fletcher, who had previously served as the member for Russell (1981–1999). He decided to retire at this election.

Paterson

Long-serving MLC and Legislative Council President Don Wing had represented Paterson since its creation in 1999, and had previously been member for Launceston from 1982 to 1999. He was re-elected unopposed.

Rumney

Rumney had been represented by Labor MLC Lin Thorp since its creation in 1999. Since she won a majority on the primary vote, no preference count was conducted.

References

2005 elections in Australia
Elections in Tasmania
2000s in Tasmania
May 2005 events in Australia
Tasmanian Legislative Council